Sacrifice in the Post-Kantian Tradition: Perspectivism, Intersubjectivity, and Recognition is a 2014 book about sacrifice by the philosopher Paolo Diego Bubbio, in which the author provides a historical and theoretical analysis of the development of the concept of sacrifice through the works of Kant, Karl Solger, Hegel, Kierkegaard, and Nietzsche.

Summary
Bubbio's main thesis is that there is a strong interrelation between the kenotic conception of sacrifice and the tradition of Kantian and post-Kantian idealism. In other words, this conception of sacrifice can be seen in the works of most of the thinkers of the post-Kantian tradition. 

Bubbio argues that the very possibility of a “realm of reason” made up by values and norms depends on the recognition of “the other” as another human being. Particularly he emphasizes the reciprocal connection of the Hegel's recognition-theoretic approach and his emphasis on kenotic sacrifice, both of which are evidence of his belonging to perspectivism. Bubbio takes this kind of perspectivism as a fundamental feature of the post-Kantian tradition.

Reception
Sacrifice in the Post-Kantian Tradition was reviewed by the philosophers Gianni Vattimo, Chris Fleming, Mark Alznauer, and Patrick Stokes.

Vattimo writes: "… Bubbio’s book is an important philosophical work: not only as an excellent analysis of sacrifice in the post-Kantian tradition but also—and perhaps especially—because it confronts what is more alive in contemporary philosophy in a clear and productive way."
Fleming writes: "Bubbio’s particular talent is for re-excavating the history of Western philosophy and asking us to see anew things that we have read before."

References

External links 
 Sacrifice in the Post-Kantian Tradition

2014 non-fiction books
American non-fiction books
Books about Georg Wilhelm Friedrich Hegel
Books about Immanuel Kant
Books about Friedrich Nietzsche
Books about sacrifice
Books by Diego Bubbio
Continental philosophy literature
English-language books
Philosophy books
SUNY Press books